Strays is a Canadian television sitcom, which premiered on CBC Television in 2021–22. A spin-off of Kim's Convenience, the series centres on Shannon Ross (Nicole Power) as she embarks on a new career in Hamilton as executive director of an animal shelter.

The cast also includes Frank Cox-O'Connell, Tina Jung, Nikki Duval, Kevin Vidal, Tony Nappo, Paula Boudreau and Emily Piggford. The series is produced by Thunderbird Entertainment.

The series had been planned to start production in 2020, but was delayed until early 2021 due to the COVID-19 pandemic in Canada. It premiered on September 14, 2021. It was renewed for a second season, which premiered in September 2022.

Production
The show initially faced some criticism for the implications of the fact that Shannon, the only white character in the core cast of Kim's Convenience, was being given her own spinoff over any of the show's Asian characters. John Doyle of The Globe and Mail noted the complexities of the situation, explaining that since all of the other major characters in Kim's Convenience were drawn from Ins Choi's original theatrical play, and Shannon was the only character who had been newly created specifically for the television series, she was the only character who was the intellectual property of the show's producers and thus the only one who could be spun off without Choi's participation.

Cast
Nicole Power as Shannon Ross
Frank Cox-O'Connell as Kristian
Tina Jung as Joy
Nikki Duval as Nikki
Kevin Vidal as Liam
Tony Nappo as Paul
Paula Boudreau as Aunt Peggy
Emily Piggford as Lara
Leah Doz as Tonya
Dennis Andres as Travis

Episodes

Season 1 (2021)

Season 2 (2022)

Critical response
Doyle favourably reviewed the first episodes of the series, writing that "The sheer energy of Strays is admirable. It's gags galore and it can be fiendishly clever contrivance, often anchored in the style of that theatrical staple, the British bedroom farce. At the same time, it's a distinctly contemporary Canadian series, with a diverse cast, and if there's a tincture of subtext that subtext is tolerance. But you'd hardly notice with all the exuberance on display. Besides, there are cute animals almost everywhere."

References

External links
 
 

2021 Canadian television series debuts
Canadian television spin-offs
2020s Canadian sitcoms
2020s Canadian workplace comedy television series
CBC Television original programming
Television shows filmed in Hamilton, Ontario
Television shows set in Hamilton, Ontario
Television productions postponed due to the COVID-19 pandemic